Michael Martín Kast Schindele (2 April 1924 – 9 May 2014) was a German officer and businessman, along with being the founder of the Kast family in Chile. After Nazi Germany's defeat following the end of World War II, he settled in Chile, where many of his descendants have had important roles in Chilean politics, such as José Antonio Kast, Miguel Kast, and Felipe Kast.

Early life 
Michael Martín Kast Schindele was born in Thalkirchdorf, a small village in Germany, on 2 April 1924. His father was from Ulm and in 1893, created a powdered milk factory in Wiedemannsdorf, Oberstaufen that was one of three in Germany to produce the recently invented product.

World War II 
German historian Armin Nolzen has written that Kast likely was a member of the Hitler Youth from the age of 14 until 1 September 1942, aged 18 when German Federal Archives show he voluntarily joined the Nazi Party. Kast and seven of his brothers joined the German Army, with Kast serving as part of his obligatory military service. Reportedly, of the 8 Kast brothers who fought in World War II, only three survived.

During World War II, Kast was first deployed on garrison duty in France in 1942, then he fought the Soviet Union in 1943 through 1944 during the Battle of Korsun–Cherkassy. Kast rose in the ranks to become a lieutenant in an effort to seek more leadership as an officer on the battlefield. In 1944 and into 1945, he was deployed to Italy to defend the Gothic Line in the Apennine Mountains and was caught by an American unit near Trento in May 1945. Kast escaped from custody during a guard change the following month and fled back to Bavaria on foot using ratlines, where he subsequently obtained a false ID indicating he was a member of the International Committee of the Red Cross according to journalist Javier Rebolledo.

Life in Chile 
In Bavaria, Kast met his future wife, born Olga Maria Kreszencia Rist (1924–2015) but generally known in Chile thereafter as Olga Rist Hagspiel, in accordance with Spanish language naming traditions, whereby both parents' surnames are formally and legally carried. The two were married on 26 October 1946, in Thalkirchdorf. Kast began to assume a false identity in 1947 during the denazification period, though when applying for his denazification certificate German officials initially did not approve one for Kast, although a prosecutor friendly to him burnt Kast's Nazi records. Following this, he fled to Argentina and, later, to Chile, with help from Vatican ratlines. He arrived in Chile in December 1950 and settled in Buin, a commune within the present-day Santiago Metropolitan Region.

Kast's wife, along with their two German-born children (Michael (later Miguel) and Barbara), arrived in Chile soon after. He founded the sausage factory Cecinas Bavaria in 1962, which is currently owned by his son, Christian Kast Rist. Kast was publicly awarded by the Municipality of Buin (1985), the Chamber of Commerce of Buin (1989), and the Carabineros of Buin (1992). He also helped in the construction of six churches in Buin. A branch of firefighters in Buin bears his name, calling itself the "Brigada Juvenil Miguel Kast" ("Miguel Kast Youth Brigade"). In 1995, he was granted Chilean citizenship.

Death 
Kast died on 10 May 2014, at the age of 90. His wake was at the Santos Ángeles Custodios Church, in Buin, the following day.

Controversy 
Kast's exact involvement in World War II and under Augusto Pinochet's military dictatorship has been a subject of controversy.

Involvement in Nazi Germany 

Journalists Javier Rebolledo and Nancy Guzmán distinctly called Michael Kast a Nazi in their 2015 book, titled A la sombra de los cuervos. José Antonio Kast disputed this in an article written for The Clinic, where he alleged that his father could have not committed any war crimes during his time in the German army, as the elder Kast often visited Germany in his later years with no police interference. José Antonio Kast publicly denied his father was a Nazi, claiming his father's military service was obligatory. A copy of Kast's Nazi Party membership card from 1942 was later published.

In 2021, Gabriel Boric, the main political opponent of José Antonio Kast in the 2021 Chilean general elections, accused José Antonio Kast of being a hypocrite, as "Migrating is a right and sometimes it is also a tragedy. Your father himself was a migrant after having fought in the Nazi army". After this, investigative journalist Mauricio Weibel revealed how Michael Kast was in the National Socialist German Workers' Party archives, confirming his membership in the party.

Involvement in Pinochet dictatorship 
Rebolledo and Guzmán also wrote that Kast (along with his son Miguel) were associated with the Pinochet dictatorship's National Information Center, taking part in the capture and forced disappearance of Pedro Vargas, who had been organizing workers at Kast's business.

José Antonio Kast also claimed it was impossible for his father to have been involved in the disappearance of Pedro Vargas, due to the fact that Vargas's father and brother (Bernabé and  Jorge) had kept working at the Kast family's sausage factory after Pedro Vargas's disappearance.

Personal life 
Michael Kast had 10 children (2 of whom were born in Germany and 8 in Chile), 50 grandchildren (at the time of his death) and some 20 great-grandchildren (at the time of his death). Two of his children died in their youth; one by drowning and the other in a car crash. Many of his children and grandchildren have had important roles in Chilean politics, serving as deputies and senators.

 Michael "Miguel" Kast Rist (1948–1983), economist, member of the Chicago Boys, and Minister of State and President of the Central Bank under the dictatorship of Augusto Pinochet; married to Cecilia Sommerhoff Hyde (born 1951); 5 children
 Bárbara Kast Sommerhoff (born 1968), sociologist
 Michael Kast Sommerhoff (born 1968), priest
 Pablo Kast Sommerhoff (born 1973), architect and Deputy (2018-2022); married to Juana Edwards Urrejola; 4 children
 Felipe Kast Sommerhoff (born 1977), architect, economist, Deputy (2014-2018), Senator (2018-2026); married to Emelia Puga Bermúdez (born 1980); 3 children
 Tomás Kast Sommerhoff (born 1979), engineer and Councilman of Vitacura (2021-2025)
 Hans Kast Rist (born 1951), served as a Roman Catholic priest for 25 years until leaving the priesthood in 2020
 Erika Kast Rist (born 1954), married to businessman Alfonso Maira Carlini (born 1948); 8 children, including
 Cristóbal Maira Kast (born 1974), owner of Agricola Rayenco
 Consuelo Maira Kast (born 1978), businesswoman
 Catalina Maira Kast (born 1984), investor
 Esteban Maira Kast (born 1986), lawyer
 Christian Kast Rist (born 1957), businessman and owner of Cecinas Bavaria; married to Pamela Prett Weber (born 1960); 4 children, including
 Mónica Kast Prett (born 1980), historian
 Andrea Kast Prett (born 1984), businesswoman, executive of Cecinas Bavaria
 Cristian Kast Prett (born 1986), businessman
 Verónica Kast Rist (born 1960), married to Andrés Tocornal Vial (born 1955); 3 children
 Rita Kast Rist (born 1962), businesswoman; married to Gonzalo Urcelay Montecinos (born 1959); 7 children, including  
 Gonzalo Urcelay Kast (born 1986), lawyer
 María Fernanda Urcelay Kast, lawyer
 José Antonio Kast Rist (born 1966), lawyer, politician, deputy (2014–2018), presidential candidate in 2017 and 2021, and founder of the Republican Party of Chile; married to María Pía Adriasola Barroilhet (born 1966); 9 children.
 Gabriela Kast Rist, author

References 

1924 births
2014 deaths
Chilean people of German descent
German emigrants to Chile
Naturalized citizens of Chile
Nazi Party members
Michael
German Army officers of World War II
German prisoners of war in World War II held by the United States
People from Oberallgäu
German Roman Catholics
Chilean Roman Catholics